Paul Aubry (14 February 1902, Chaumont, Haute-Marne – 2 June 1998) was a French politician. He represented the Radical Party in the National Assembly from 1951 to 1955.

References

1902 births
1998 deaths
People from Chaumont, Haute-Marne
Politicians from Grand Est
Radical Party (France) politicians
Deputies of the 2nd National Assembly of the French Fourth Republic

fr:Paul Aubry